Theory of population may refer to:

Malthusianism, a theory of population by Thomas Malthus (1766–1834)
 An Essay on the Principle of Population, the book in which Malthus propounded his theory
Neo-Malthusian theory  of Paul R. Ehrlich (born 1932) and others
Theory of demographic transition by Warren Thompson (1887–1973)

See also
Demography
Population
Population growth
Population bottleneck
Population ecology